Liam Welham (born 11 November 1988) is an English rugby league footballer who plays at  or  for Midlands Hurricanes in the Betfred Championship.

He has played for Hull FC (reserve team), Hull Kingston Rovers (reserve team), Featherstone Rovers, Dewsbury Rams (on loan), Hunslet Hawks and Doncaster in Kingstone Press League 1. He is the brother of rugby league players Kris Welham and Matt Welham.
Welham left Doncaster part way through the 2019 season after finding first team opportunities limited; initially he signed a contract to play for Keighley Cougars but was released within days and without playing a game for Keighley due to a change in circumstances.

References

External links
Doncaster profile

1988 births
Living people
Coventry Bears players
Dewsbury Rams players
Doncaster R.L.F.C. players
English rugby league players
Featherstone Rovers players
Hunslet R.L.F.C. players
Rugby league centres
Rugby league players from Kingston upon Hull
Rugby league second-rows